A phrop is an attempted neologism used to indicate a polite statement used in social contexts where the true meaning is the opposite of what is expressed. An example is the parting comment We must have lunch sometime, meaning We don't particularly want to meet again. The term was coined by mountaineer Sir Arnold Lunn. It has not entered common use.

See also
 Antiphrasis
 Autantonym
 Euphemism

References
 Geoffrey T. Hellman, The Talk of the Town, "Phrop Collector", The New Yorker, 20 December 1952, p. 25 
 Arnold Henry Moore Lunn, "Memory to memory", Hollis & Carter, 1956, p. 12
 Philip Howard, "The State of the Language", Penguin Books, 1984, pp. 115–117
 "Modern manners"", The Times, 13 November 2006 

Figures of speech